Rear-Admiral Thomas Edward Laws Moore, FRS (circa 1820 – 30 April 1872) was a Royal Navy officer and explorer. He was Governor of the Falkland Islands from 1855 to 1862. Laws is spelled Lawes in some sources.

Moore was born in Brompton, Chatham, Kent, probably in 1820. He joined the Royal Navy in 1833 as a first-class volunteer and spent was mate of HMS Terror during the Ross expedition. He then commander the barque Pagoda and conducted surveys in the Antarctic. From 1847 to 1852, he commanded HMS Plover, which was searching for Franklin's lost expedition; during the voyage, he called at Stanley, Falkland Islands in 1848. He was promoted to Captain in 1852 and was elected a Fellow of the Royal Society in 1854.

In 1855, Moore accepted the governorship of the Falkland Islands, arriving on 7 November with his family.

References 

1872 deaths
Fellows of the Royal Society
Royal Navy admirals
Governors of the Falkland Islands